Octoberon is the seventh studio album by Barclay James Harvest, released in 1976. The band had hoped that Elliot Mazer would again produce, but after hanging around in San Francisco for six weeks, they were forced to return home and produce it themselves.

In 2003 a remastered CD was issued with five bonus tracks. In 2017 a 3-disc CD/DVD special edition was released. This features new stereo and surround mixes in addition to the remastered originals, plus the 2003 bonus tracks, one new bonus track, and two videos.

Critical reception

In the UK music magazine Sounds, Tim Lott expressed his frustration with the album, saying, "Unfortunately, Octoberon is no major departure from [their] disappointing formula. But despite that, there are some fine, imaginative moments which point once again to the never-fulfilled potential." A review of the album, appearing in a January 1977 issue of Billboard magazine, said that Octoberon "has delivered an extremely accessible spacey-but-lyrical LP in the most popular style of Pink Floyd or Yes. There is nothing harsh or cultish about this music." In another mixed review, AllMusic's Paul Collins wrote that Octoberon lacks the harmonies evident in the band's earlier records, and that the album is "not up to the level of their best work, but worth a listen for fans."

Track listing

"The World Goes On" (Les Holroyd) – 6:29
"May Day" (John Lees) – 8:00
"Ra" (Woolly Wolstenholme) – 7:21
"Rock 'n' Roll Star" (Holroyd) – 5:18
"Polk Street Rag" (Lees) – 5:39
"Believe in Me" (Holroyd) – 4:24
"Suicide?" (Lees) – 7:56

2003 remastered CD
As above, plus:
      8. "Rock 'n' Roll Star" (early mix) - 4:53
      9. "Polk Street Rag" (first mix) 5:30
      10. "Ra" (first mix)
      11. "Rock 'n' Roll Star" (version recorded at Marquee Studios)
      12. "Suicide?" (first mix)

2017 remastered 3-disc set

Disc One (CD)
Tracks 1-7 as above, plus:
      8. "Rock 'n' Roll Star" (first mix) - 4:53
      9. "Polk Street Rag" (early mix) 5:30
      10. "Ra" (early mix)
      11. "Suicide?" (early mix)
N.B. These appear to be the same mixes as tracks 8-10 & 12 on the 2003 CD, although the descriptions "first mix" and "early mix" have been swapped.

Disc Two (CD)
New stereo mixes of Tracks 1-7 as above, plus:
      8. "Rock 'n' Roll Star" (Marquee Studios version for Top of the Pops)
      9. "May Day" (alternate intro version)

Disc Three (DVD)
Audio content:
Three mixes of tracks 1-7 as above, plus track 9 on Disc Two: 5.1 surround mix, 96 kHz/24-bit new and original stereo mixes.
Video content:
"Rock 'n' Roll Star"
"The World Goes On"
(Polydor promotional films as broadcast on The Old Grey Whistle Test, 1 March 1977)

Personnel
Barclay James Harvest
 John Lees - acoustic and electric guitars, vocals, harmonies
 Wolly Wolstenholme - keyboards, vocals
 Les Holroyd - bass, acoustic guitar, vocals, harmonies
 Mel Pritchard - drums, percussion

Charts

References

1976 albums
Barclay James Harvest albums
Polydor Records albums